The Highgate Ostrich Show Farm is an ostrich farm located 10 kilometres south of Oudtshoorn in the Western Cape, South Africa.

This large farm specializes in the breeding of ostriches and is open to visitors providing specialized information about the various stages of the birds development, provided with the opportunity to visit young offspring and an ostrich pen.

Whilst it mainly focuses on the development of the ostrich, tourism is an important source of income and keeps the farm running.

Other ostrich farms in the area include Safari Show Farm.

External links

References

Nature conservation in South Africa
Tourist attractions in the Western Cape
Ostrich farms
Farms in South Africa